Tudeh Zan (also Romanized as Tūdeh Zan; also known as Tūzāzan) is a village in Gudarzi Rural District, Oshtorinan District, Borujerd County, Lorestan Province, Iran. At the 2006 census, its population was 1,862, in 490 families.

References 

Towns and villages in Borujerd County